Continental Philosophy Review is a quarterly peer-reviewed academic journal covering different areas of continental philosophy. It is published by Springer Science+Business Media and the editor-in-chief is Anthony Steinbock (Stony Brook University). The journal was established in 1968 as Man and World, obtaining its current title in 1998.

Abstracting and indexing
The journal is abstracted and indexed in:

See also
List of philosophy journals

References

External links
 

Quarterly journals
English-language journals
Publications established in 1968
Philosophy journals
Continental philosophy literature
Springer Science+Business Media academic journals